On the Money, formerly The Wall Street Journal Report, is an American syndicated weekly television program airing on weekends, and on Sunday evenings on CNBC. The program is hosted by Becky Quick. Political, business, and economic figures are interviewed on the program; guests have included Henry Paulson and Colin Powell.

History

The Wall Street Journal Report premiered on September 4, 1970. Maria Bartiromo joined the program in September 2004, replacing Consuelo Mack as its host. The program features interviews, discussions, weekly job reports, stock market updates, and stories about the economy. The program was renamed On the Money with Maria Bartiromo from the January 6, 2013 broadcast with the end of CNBC's content agreement with the Wall Street Journal owner Dow Jones & Company, which was purchased by News Corporation (owners of CNBC's competitor Fox Business Network) in 2007; On the Money had previously been the title of a daily program on CNBC from 2005 to 2009. Bartiromo left CNBC on November 22, 2013, moving to Fox Business Network and making that weekend's On the Money her last. The program was subsequently re-titled On the Money and since then has been hosted by CNBC's Becky Quick, who also appears on Squawk Box. The show ended production in December 2019 along with Nightly Business Report.

References

External links
 
 

1970 American television series debuts
1980s American television talk shows
1990s American television talk shows
2000s American television talk shows
2010s American television talk shows
2020s American television talk shows
Business-related television series
1970s American television news shows
1980s American television news shows
1990s American television news shows
2000s American television news shows
2010s American television news shows
2020s American television news shows
First-run syndicated television programs in the United States